Gary Graff (born 1960) is an American music journalist and author.

Biography
Originally from Pittsburgh, Pennsylvania, Graff attended Taylor Allderdice High School where he wrote for school newspaper The Taylor Allderdice Foreword. He received his Bachelor of Journalism degree from the University of Missouri. He wrote for the Detroit Free Press from 1982 until 1995 when there was a strike at the newspaper. Graff refused to cross the picket line and subsequently lost his job. Graff has contributed to publications including The New York Times, Billboard, The Boston Globe and San Francisco Chronicle, as well as writing a regular column for Guitar World magazine.

In 2005, Graff published The Ties That Bind: Bruce Springsteen A to E to Z. One reviewer said that the book "comes close to being the definitive study" on Bruce Springsteen. He is also the founding editor of MusicHound's "Essential Album Guide" series, which began with MusicHound Rock in 1996. Graff is also a frequent contributor to The Drew and Mike Podcast and the Bob and Brian show in Milwaukee, WI. He now lives in Detroit, Michigan.

Bibliography
1996 (rev. 1999): MusicHound Rock: The Essential Album Guide (Visible Ink Press)
2005: The Ties That Bind: Bruce Springsteen A to E to Z (Visible Ink Press)

References

1960 births
American music journalists
Living people
Writers from Detroit
Writers from Pittsburgh
Detroit Free Press people
Taylor Allderdice High School alumni